Whaley is a small village in Derbyshire, England, located one mile from Whaley Thorns, 1½ miles from Elmton, 1½ miles from Langwith and  2½ miles from Bolsover.

The village has a garage and a former watermill, now a home, of which the large mill pond still survives.

Set in arable farmland, the village was a farming settlement, and remains so to this day with several farming families living in the village. The Diocese of Derby archives record that there was an ancient chapel in the village, but no traces of that remain.  A school, known as St Mary's Mission, and school house were built in the 1860s but both these are now residential.

There are three pre-historic rock shelters behind the former school, on Magg Lane and opposite the pub, the Black Horse.  These are linked to the Creswell Crags.

Scarcliffe Park, an area of woodland to the south end of the village, has Bronze Age and Roman remains.  It is surrounded by a Pale ditch.

The village is a Conservation Area and has an active residents' association.  The majority of the buildings are constructed from the local limestone.

The Waterworks on Whaley Moor featured in Channel 4 series, Grand Designs.

Etymology
Whaley most likely comes from  the Celtic word Whallis, meaning water. A tributary of the River Poulter runs through the village, and there are a number of local springs.  A well, now capped, was situated near Red Brick Cottage.

References

External links

Villages in Derbyshire
Bolsover District